Bruno Schiavi (born 10 July 1972) is an Australian fashion designer and businessman.

Early life 
Schiavi was born on 10 July 1972 in Sydney's Inner West. His father worked for Italian embassies; the family moved several times before eventually settling in Australia. He attended Rosebank College in the Inner Western Sydney suburb of Five Dock, graduating in 1990.

Schiavi's university studies were in business and marketing. He worked at Target for eight years, starting in the 1980s. In 1995 he and his mother launched Jupi Corporation to sell women's underwear over the internet.

Design work 
In 1998 Schiavi invented a sock with a zippered pocket and sold it through Gowings. This sock fuelled the growth of his company, which in 2004 had sales of AUD 3 million, mostly from Schiavi-designed underwear.

In 2003 Schiavi began working with celebrities when he had Big Brother contestants promote underwear designed by him.  He has since collaborated with Priscilla Presley, Brett Lee, Janet Jackson, and the Kardashians. In the mid-2000s Schiavi's company expanded to Los Angeles.

Many of his products, including the Kardashian Kollection, are sold for the mass market through department stores like Sears. By 2013 Jupi Corporation had a turnover of $75 million, 60 percent of that from outside Australia.

On 12 August 2013 Schiavi launched One Dress a Day, an online store that sells a new Schiavi-designed dress every day.

In 2015 Schiavi expanded into children's clothing, developing a Kardashian Kids line for his Kardashian Kollection brand when the Kardashians had children. The new brand was a commercial success, with 86 percent of the stock sold within 72 hours of the launch in stores and online via Babies R Us. Following Schiavi's usual business model of mass market sales, the Kardashian Kids brand will be sold in Woolworths Big W stores in Australia from August 2015.

References

External links 

Bruno Schiavi on Facebook

Living people
1972 births
Australian fashion designers
People from the Inner West (Sydney)
People from Los Angeles